Jukka Matti Kopra (born 11 February 1967 in Helsinki) is a Finnish politician currently serving in the Parliament of Finland for the National Coalition Party at the South-Eastern Finland constituency. In 2019, Kopra received a Master of Science in Technology degree from Lappeenranta University of Technology.

Present memberships in committees 

 Chancellery Commission (member) 02.05.2019–
 Finance Committee (deputy member) 18.06.2019–
 Subcommittee for Administration and Security (member) 06.09.2019–
 Housing and Environment Subcommittee (additional member) 06.09.2019–
 Transport and Communications Committee (deputy member) 18.06.2019–
 Defense Committee (member) 18.06.2019–
 Auditors of the Bank of Finland (member) 18.06.2019–

Position in the parliamentary group 

 Parliamentary Group of the National Coalition Party (2nd vice chair) 18.04.2019–

References

External links
 Eduskunta profile
 Personal page

1967 births
Living people
Politicians from Helsinki
Lappeenranta University of Technology alumni
National Coalition Party politicians
Members of the Parliament of Finland (2011–15)
Members of the Parliament of Finland (2015–19)
Members of the Parliament of Finland (2019–23)